Snake's head is a common name for several plants and may refer to:

Fritillaria meleagris, native to Europe
Malacothrix coulteri, native to North America